Bainkun is a small village in Tehsil Paonta sahib, district Sirmour, Himachal Pradesh India. It is situated at Paonta-Jamniwala road which is further connected to NH-72 at Majra. This village comes under the Jamniwala Gram Panchayat. The nearest villages are Jamniwala and Kishanpura. It is on the bank of the river Bata.

Pin code: 173025
STD Code: 01704
Language: Hindi, Punjabi
Time Zone: GMT+5:30
Altitude: 389m

References

Villages in Sirmaur district